Rainhard Jürgen Fendrich (born 27 February 1955) is an Austrian singer, composer, entertainer, and actor. He is one of the most successful Austropop musicians, and his songs are written in Viennese German. He is very popular in Austria, but less so in other German-speaking countries. In non-German-speaking countries he is little known. His song from 1990, "I Am from Austria" (its lyrics, except for the title, are in Viennese German) is still popular in Austria and considered to be the "secret national anthem".

Early life and education
Fendrich's mother was a Sudeten German while his father's family originated from Serbia. His father was a mechanical engineer, his mother a model. He has a brother, Harald Fendrich, who is six years younger than him and also a musician who played the bass guitar in his band and is now part of WIR4 (Ulli Bäer, Gary Lux, Harry Stampfer). At the age of ten, Fendrich was sent to a Catholic boarding school, where he lived until the age of 17. At the boarding school he was an altar boy and sang in the choir. His piano lessons were cancelled because he was too bad at mathematics. According to his own statements, he thought he was "chubby" and not very attractive as a child. When he got a guitar at the age of 15, he taught himself the chords and also began to write lyrics. Frustrating experiences with girls at that time find their expression later, for example in the songs Cyrano (1991) or Frieda (2001). He dropped out of law school in order to finance acting and singing lessons by working various jobs.

Career

Beginning of career and commercial breakthrough (1980-1986) 
Fendrich appeared at the Theater an der Wien from 1980 (in Die Gräfin vom Naschmarkt and Chicago) and played Judas in the musical Jesus Christ Superstar there in 1982. In 1980 he was also engaged by Hans Gratzer for a performance series of Hamlet at the Schauspielhaus, made one of his first television appearances as a singer on the ORF program Wir-extra for the benefit of children in the Third World, and received his first recording contract.

Another appearance followed in Tritsch Tratsch in 1981 with the song Zweierbeziehung (Two-way relationship of a man with his car). The debut album Ich wollte nie einer von denen sein (I never wanted to be one of them) was released in May of the same year, but initially failed to achieve high sales figures.

In August 1981 he landed the Austrian summer hit of the year with Strada del sole (in a similar style, about a "vacation relationship"). The single sold 99,000 copies in Austria, which would correspond to today's status of triple platinum. Moreover, in 2020 the song was voted 14th among the "100 most important Austrian pop songs" by the pop culture magazine The Gap as part of the AustroTOP ranking. Equally successful was the second album Und alles ist ganz anders word’n (And everything has become completely different). The next number one hits followed in 1982 with Schickeria and Oben Ohne (Topless). At that time Fendrich was already celebrated as a shooting star of Austropop.

In 1983 Fendrich presented his first compilation called A winzig klaner Tropfen Zeit (A tiny drop of time). In the same year he also performed with Wolfgang Ambros at the School Closing Open Air in Vienna's Gerhard-Hanappi Stadium. This concert was released on a live compilation with the album Open Air.

Fendrich achieved his next success in 1983 with Auf und davon (Up and away). Although the album couldn't quite meet the commercial expectations of the previous album and the singles didn't manage that either, Fendrich performed at several sold-out concerts on his tour. This led to the song Weus'd a Herz hast wia a Bergwerk (Cause you have a heart like a mine) being available twice as a single; in a studio version and in a live version.

After a short retreat from the public eye, the albums Wien bei Nacht (Vienna by night) and Kein schöner Land (No country more beautiful) were released in 1985 and 1986. He also released another live compilation.

Breakthrough in Germany (1988–1997) 
With Macho, Macho, sung largely in Viennese, another of his singles reached the top position in 1988. In addition, this was followed by the big breakthrough in Germany with number 2. Fendrich also achieved a top 3 position in Switzerland. He wrote the song in five minutes, it was inspired by an article in Brigitte magazine.

Equally well known in Austria and Germany is his appearance with Reinhard Mey, with Ein Loch in der Kanne (A hole in the pot) in the television program Was wäre wenn (What if) in 1988.

In 1989 the album Von Zeit zu Zeit (From time to time) was released, which could not meet Fendrich's commercial expectations. The singles Von Zeit zu Zeit and I Am from Austria were also not successful at first. Later, however, the title I Am from Austria developed into the "secret federal anthem of Austria" and was voted the "greatest Austropop hit of all time" in 2011 as part of the ORF program Österreich wählt (Austria votes).

In 1991 the album Nix is fix (Nothing is fixed), produced by Tato Gomez at BMG Ariola, was released, which could repeat the success of earlier times. The album stayed in the Austrian charts for 32 weeks and was number 1 for five weeks.

A year later, Fendrich performed with the Vienna Symphony Orchestra at the opening of the Vienna Festival. Under the project "Vienna Symphonic Orchestra Project" (VSOP), by and with Christian Kolonovits, who conducted the concert and in which the Arnold Schoenberg Choir also participated. This concert was released as an album and after some time made it to the first place in the Austrian music charts.

Fendrich took over as host of the ARD program Herzblatt (Sweetheart) in 1993 after Rudi Carrell, which he presented on German television until 1997. In the same year, he launched the comedy show Nix is fix (ORF/ARD). The cabaret and media-critical format was not continued despite good reviews.

A special postage stamp was issued by the Austrian Post Office in 1993.

Along the way, Fendrich recorded the album Brüder (Brothers), which also managed to place in Germany after a long time. The singles Midlife Crisis and Brüder, which were rather unpopular in Austria, made it into the German charts. The album was, despite the great commercial success, rather negatively received by the media in Fendrich's home country. The reason for this was that Fendrich slowly turned away from the Viennese dialect with this album. As a promotion for Herzblatt, the ballads album Lieder mit Gefühl (Songs with feeling) was also presented.

In the mid-1990s, Fendrich did not release any music. He made his comeback with the album Blond (Blonde). The title song became his last major number one hit to date. The single Blond sold 10,000 copies in Austria and was awarded gold. In addition, after the programming reform of the Austrian station Ö3, the song was one of the few Austrian songs played on the radio.

Return to Austria (from 1997) 
In 1997, Fendrich initiated a benefit concert for the homeless, which was intended as a one-off event, at which he performed together with Wolfgang Ambros and Georg Danzer. The overwhelming success led to this team performing as Austria 3 until 2006, creating joint live albums and compilations. The band announced their split on June 10, 2006. Their last concert took place on July 24, 2006 in Altusried, Swabia. On April 16, 2007, the circle of friends reunited at Georg Danzer's comeback concert in the Viennese City Hall to perform three of their old songs; afterwards, several parties planned a possible comeback, but Georg Danzer died of lung cancer on June 21, 2007.

Further artistic achievements 
Also in 1997, Fendrich had success as a film actor in the lead role of Fröhlich geschieden (Happily divorced) (ZDF) alongside Christina Plate and Helmut Fischer. In 1998 he played Billy Flynn in the musical Chicago at the Theater an der Wien, and in 2002 and 2003 he appeared as Jeff Zodiak in the musical WakeUp, written by him and arranged by Christian Kolonovits and Harold Faltermeyer, with less success at the Raimund Theater.

Fendrich received the Austrian Golden Romy award for most popular presenter in TV entertainment three times. In 1994, 1995 and 2000, he was nominated for the Amadeus Austrian Music Award four times before winning it in 2002. Austrian NEWS magazine readers voted him "Best Entertainer of the Decade" in same year.

As an entertainer, he was the first host of Die Millionenshow, the Austrian version of Who Wants to Be a Millionaire. He also hosted the game show Deal or No Deal in 2005. Both shows aired on ORF. From 2008 he hosted the show Sing and Win! (a variation of the US format Don't forget the lyrics) on the private TV station ATV.

Rest of career 
He has appeared in numerous Austrian and German movies.

The concert on Donauinselfest which Fendrich gave "instead and for Georg Danzer" who a few weeks before the event had to refuse because of his rapidly progressing disease, attracted 200.000 fans on 23 June 2007.

Private life
Fendrich was married to Andrea Sator from 1984 to 2003, with whom he has two sons. Their daughter died of a viral disease in 1989 at the age of 17 months.

When Fendrich was found to have bought cocaine in early April 2006 in the course of police surveillance of a dealer ring, he confessed and claimed to have been using it for 15 years. Immediately afterwards, the artist went through voluntary withdrawal and has since participated in anti-drug campaigns, but was sentenced to an unconditional fine of 37,500 euros in May for possession of cocaine and the (later largely abandoned) "passing on of drugs".

On December 4, 2010, Fendrich married his long-time girlfriend Ina Nadine Wagler in Berlin. Their son was born on March 10, 2011. After the couple separated in 2012, the divorce took place in November 2016.

Discography

Studio albums

Live albums

Compilation albums

Austria 3 
 1998: Austria3 - Live (with Wolfgang Ambros and Georg Danzer)
 1998: Austria3 - Live Vol. 2 (with Wolfgang Ambros and Georg Danzer)
 2000: Austria3 - Die Dritte (with Wolfgang Ambros and Georg Danzer)

DVDs 
 2002: Ein Saitensprung
 2004: Jetzt

Singles

 "Little Drummer Boy" with Eric Minsk, and "Stille Nacht" with Andrew Edge.

References

External links 

 
 

1955 births
Living people
Musicians from Vienna
20th-century Austrian male singers
Austrian male composers
Austrian composers
Austrian male musical theatre actors
21st-century Austrian male singers